Sam Baldwin may refer to:
Sam Baldwin, character in Sleepless in Seattle  played by Tom Hanks
Sam Baldwin, author of For Fukui's Sake
Sam Baldwin, character in The Legend of Valentino
Sam Baldwin, character in Incident In San Francisco

See also
Samuel Baldwin (disambiguation)